Achiyalatopa is a giant monster in Zuni mythology. The monster has celestial powers, and possesses feathers made of flint knives, which it throws at objects.

References
Jones, Gertrude. Dictionary of Mythology Folklore and Symbols. New York: The Scarecrow Press, Inc. 1962.
Probert Encyclopedia article on Achiyalatopa

Zuni mythology
Legendary creatures of the indigenous peoples of North America